An orthopedic implant is a medical device manufactured to replace a missing  joint or bone or to support a damaged bone. The medical implant is mainly fabricated using stainless steel and titanium alloys for strength and the plastic coating that is done on it acts as an artificial cartilage. Internal fixation is an operation in orthopedics that involves the surgical implementation of implants for the purpose of repairing a bone. During the surgery of broken bones through internal fixation the bone fragments are first reduced into their normal alignment then they are held together with the help of internal fixators such as plates, screws, nails, pins and wires.

Eponymous implants and their uses
 Austin-Moore prosthesis for fracture of the neck of femur
 Baksi's prosthesis for elbow replacement
 Charnley prosthesis for total hip replacement
 Condylar blade plate for condylar fractures of femur
 Ender's nail for fixing intertrochanteric fracture
 Grosse-Kempf nail  for tibial or femoral shaft fracture
  pin (or LIH for Lars Ingvar Hansson), a hook-pin used for fractures of the femoral neck
 Harrington rod for fixation of the spine
 Hartshill rectangle for fixation of the spine
 Insall Burstein prosthesis : for total knee replacement 
 Richard N.W. Wohns interspinous implant and implantation instrument intended to be implanted between two adjacent dorsal spines
 Kirschner wire for fixation of small bones
 Kuntscher nail for fracture of the shaft of femur
 Luque rod : for fixation of the spine
 Moore's pin for fracture of the neck of femur
 Neer's prosthesis for shoulder replacement
 Rush nail for diaphyseal fractures of a long bone
 Smith Peterson nail for fracture of the neck of femur
 Smith Peterson nail with McLaughlin's plate for intertrochanteric fracture
 Seidel nail for fracture of the shaft of humerus
 Souter's prosthesis for elbow replacement
 Steffee plate for fixation of the spine
 Steinmann pin for skeletal traction
 Swanson prosthesis for the replacement of joints of the fingers
 Talwalkar nail for fracture of radius and ulna
 Thompson prosthesis for fracture of the neck of femur

Branded Systems

Image gallery

Research progress
A surface engineering method was developed for biodegradable magnesium alloys to enhance orthopedic implants.

See also
 CNT Bio-Stress Sensors

References

External links
 View Orthopedic Implants by Body Parts
 Cannulated Screws
 Bone Plates
 Materials used to make Orthopedic Implants

Orthopedic implants
Orthopedic implants
List